Yuraccacsa or Yuraccasa (possibly from Quechua yuraq white, q'asa mountain pass, "white mountain pass") is a  mountain in the west of the Chila mountain range in the Andes of Peru. It is located in the Arequipa Region, Castilla Province, on the border of the districts Chachas and Choco. Yuraccacsa lies south of Chila, the highest mountain in the range, and Choquepirhua, southeast of Asnohuañusja and northeast of a lake named Cochapunco (possibly from Quechua for "lake reservoir") and the peaks of Cerani and Casiri.

References

Mountains of Peru
Mountains of Arequipa Region